This is a list of seasons completed by the Saint Louis Billikens men's college basketball team.

Seasons

 The MVC also cancelled the season due to World War II.
  The regional playoff was not counted as an official NCAA tourney game.

Notes

Saint Louis Billikens
Saint Louis Billikens men's basketball seasons
Saint Louis Billikens basketball seasons